Christiaan Frederick Beyers Papenfus (10 December 1915 – 18 November 1941) was a South African first-class cricketer and South African Air Force pilot.

Papenfus was born at Barberton in November 1915. He made his debut in first-class cricket for Free State against Natal at Bloemfontein in the 1936–37 Currie Cup. He made four further first-class appearances for Orange Free State, the last of which came in February 1940. Papenfus met with success in his five matches, taking 25 wickets at an average of 19.88. He took two five wicket hauls, the first of which came in his third first-class match against Border when he took figures of 5 for 39; despite this, Orange Free State lost the match by 191 runs. In his final first-class appearance against North Eastern Transvaal, he took his second five wicket haul with figures of 6 for 88, and recorded his only first-class half century with a score of 60 batting at number ten; Orange Free State against lost this match by 83 runs. Wisden noted that despite this innings, he was "normally of little account as a batsman".

Papenfus served as a sergeant in the South African Air Force during the Second World War. Attached to 21 Squadron, he served as crew on Maryland bombers. 21 Squadron was tasked with attacking German and Italian bases as part of the North African campaign. His was killed in action over Gazola in Italian Libya on 18 November 1941, when his bomber was shot down by the Regia Aeronautica. He was buried in the Knightsbridge War Cemetery.

References

External links

1915 births
1941 deaths
People from Barberton, Mpumalanga
South African cricketers
Free State cricketers
South African Air Force personnel of World War II
South African military personnel killed in World War II